The 2014–15 SSV Jahn Regensburg season is the 108th season in the club's football history. In 2014–15, the club played in the 3. Liga, the third tier of German football. This was the last season in the season in the old Jahnstadion, the team's home since 1926. In the next season, Regensburg would play in the new Continental Arena which was built at that time.

Review and events
The club's management was not fully content with the results of manager Thomas Stratos and so his contract was not renewed at the end of the season. The new manager is former TSV 1860 Munich manager Alexander Schmidt.

Jahn Regensburg took part in the 2014–15 Bavarian Cup, where the winner would qualify for the 2015–16 DFB-Pokal. However, they were eliminated in the Round of 16 by SpVgg SV Weiden by a 1–0 deficit.

After six defeats in a row and the subsequent drop to the last place, the manager was heavily criticized. The club's management was convinced that not the manager was to blame for the bad results, but that the available players were not good enough. They signed several new players in October and the team won on matchday 14 against SG Sonnenhof Großaspach, but was not able to leave the last place in the table. After a loss and a draw on matchday 15 and 16, the team lost 4–1 in Chemnitz after a pathetic performance. This led to the suspension of manager Alexander Schmidt. U23 manager Ilija Dzepina and youth coordinator Marcus Jahn managed the team until a new manager was signed. On 18 November 2014, Christian Brand was appointed as new manager of the club. Brand set a new start record for a manager of Jahn Regensburg with five losses in five matches. The club acquired eight new players in the winter transfer window and was able to start the new year with a victory. But the team was not able to leave the last place in the league and relegation to the Regionalliga Bayern was unavoidable already three matchdays before the end of the season.

Matches

Legend

Friendly matches

3. Liga

League table

Matches

Squad

Squad and statistics

Squad, matches played and goals scored

Transfers

In

Out

References

External links
 2014–15 SSV Jahn Regensburg season at Weltfussball.de 
 2014–15 SSV Jahn Regensburg season at kicker.de 
 2014–15 SSV Jahn Regensburg season at Fussballdaten.de 

Jahn Regensburg
SSV Jahn Regensburg seasons